Novosad is a village and municipality in Košice Region, Slovakia.

Novosad may also refer to:
 Novosad, Volgograd Oblast, Russia
 Novosad Island, Antarctica
 Novosad (surname)

See also